Wilhelm August Stryowski (1834–1917) was a Polish-German painter. Born in Gdańsk (Danzig), he finished the Gdańsk School of Fine Arts. He studied here under Johann Carl Schultz, the school founder and director, and with a scholarship he later studied in Academy of Fine Arts in Düsseldorf. From 1870 to 1873 he was one of creators of the City Museum (now, National Museum in Gdańsk). From 1880 he was art conservator of the museum collection, and from 1887 he was the museum's curator and at the same time - he was a secretary of Association of Friends of Art. From 1873 he lectured in the School of Arts and Artistic Crafts. In 1912, partially paralyzed, he lost command of one hand. He died in Essen in 1917 and was subsequently buried in Gdańsk according to his last will. His wife Clara (née Bädeker, or Baedeker) - was a niece of the editor of well-known guide books.

Most famous works by W.A.Stryowski depict Gdańsk society - Jews, Romas, workers, prominent citizens. One of the streets in Gdańsk is named after him.

Notes and references

 Short bio in Gazeta Wyborcza, 2003
Stryowski on artnet auctions, New York, NY, USA
Wilhelm August Stryowski, Flisacy nad Wisłą, 1881, 56x93 cm, oil on canvas, at the National Museum in Gdańsk 

19th-century German painters
German male painters
20th-century German painters
19th-century Polish painters
19th-century German male artists
20th-century Polish painters
20th-century German male artists
1834 births
1917 deaths
Kunstakademie Düsseldorf alumni
Polish male painters